Dead Calm may refer to:

 Dead Calm (novel), a 1963 novel by Charles F. Williams
 Dead Calm (film), a 1989 Australian film based on the novel